Denso Kasius (born 6 October 2002) is a Dutch professional footballer who plays as a defender for Rapid Wien on loan from Serie A club Bologna.

Club career
In January 2021, Kasius joined FC Volendam on loan.

On 30 January 2022, he signed for Italian club Bologna. 

On 26 January 2023, Kasius joined Austrian Bundesliga club Rapid Wien on loan until the end of the season.

Career statistics

Club

References

External links

2002 births
Footballers from Delft
Living people
Dutch footballers
Netherlands youth international footballers
Association football defenders
Sparta Rotterdam players
Feyenoord players
ADO Den Haag players
FC Utrecht players
Jong FC Utrecht players
FC Volendam players
Bologna F.C. 1909 players
SK Rapid Wien players
Eerste Divisie players
Serie A players
Dutch expatriate footballers
Expatriate footballers in Italy
Dutch expatriate sportspeople in Italy
Expatriate footballers in Austria
Dutch expatriate sportspeople in Austria